Moreland is an area and electoral ward in the City of Gloucester, Gloucestershire, England.  The area is commonly known locally as Linden: the electoral ward is named after the Moreland match factory which closed in 1976. The population of the Gloucester ward was 10,253 at the 2011 Census.

References

Areas of Gloucester